The Tanzania national rugby union team represents Tanzania in international rugby union. They are known as the Twigas (Swahili for "giraffes"). Tanzania is a member of the International Rugby Board.

In the 1970s, expatriates and Tanzanians regularly played on the national team in an annual competition against Kenya. Tanzania played their first officially recognised international match in 2004, defeating Burundi. Tanzania won the CAR Castel Cup in 2006.

Tanzania won the 2007 CAR Castel Cup Division 2, South Zone, Pool A tournament held in Arusha late June. The 'Twigas' defeated Mayotte 18-11 on June 26 and Rwanda 53-6 on June 30. Burundi were unable to send their team. Tanzania went on to play Botswana, the winner of South Zone, Pool B, in Gaborone on 18 August. Tanzania lost 14-37.

See also
 East Africa rugby union team
 Rugby union in Tanzania

Notes

a.  The first match for both Kenya and Tanzania (Tanganyika at the time) took place in 1954 at Arusha.  It was held shortly before the First Tuskers Copperbelt tour later that year and served as a selection trial for the tour.  This match was won by Kenya though the exact score is not known.  The next year the fixture was repeated, again at Arusha, Tanganyika winning by 11 points to 3.  The third match occurred a year later in 1956, again at Arusha; Kenya winning this encounter 0-13.

External links
 Tanzania on IRB.com
 Tanzania win CAR Castel Cup
 Tanzania on rugbydata.com
 Rugby in Tanzania

References

 

African national rugby union teams
Rugby union in Tanzania
R